Calliostoma granti, common name the multibeaded maurea, is a species of sea snail, a marine gastropod mollusk in the family Calliostomatidae.

Some authors place this taxon in the subgenus Calliostoma (Maurea).

Description
The size of the shell varies between 38 mm and 45 mm.

Distribution
This marine species occurs off New Zealand.

References

 Marshall, B.A. 1995. A revision of the Recent Calliostoma species of New Zealand (Mollusca: Gastropoda: Trochoidea). The Nautilus 108: 83–127

External links
 

granti
Gastropods described in 1931